Ganj-e Besiar (also Romanized as Ganj-e Besīār) is a village in Margown Rural District, Margown District, Boyer-Ahmad County, Kohgiluyeh and Boyer-Ahmad Province, Iran. At the 2006 census, its population was 53, in 10 families.

References 

Populated places in Boyer-Ahmad County